The Division of Royal Volunteers ( or Voluntários Reais do Príncipe, later Divisão de Voluntários Reais do Rei following the prince's ascent to kingship) was a detachment of the Portuguese military, formed in 1815 and deployed to Rio de Janeiro on 30 March 1816. The unit was commanded by Carlos Frederico Lecor, Viscount of Laguna. 

The unit was formed on order of then-Prince Dom João VI, to consist of 5,000 men, and invaded the Banda Oriental (in modern Uruguay), as part of the Portuguese conquest of the Banda Oriental. The unit occupied the city of Montevideo on 20 January 1817.

References

Military units and formations of Brazil
Military units and formations of Portugal
Military units and formations established in 1815
History of Montevideo
1817 in Uruguay
1815 establishments in Portugal